Persatuan Sepakbola Indonesia Palu or abbreviated Persipal is an Indonesian football club based in Palu, Central Sulawesi. In the last season, they actually played in Liga 3 but failed to be promoted after finishing 3rd in the National round Group E. But in mid-2022, they bought Muba Babel United's slot and automatically promoted themselves to Liga 2. Persipal played at Gawalise Stadium in downtown Palu, Central Sulawesi.

History
Persipal had a heyday in the 1970s and was one of the favorite clubs in Indonesia during the Perserikatan era. Several Persipal legend players, including Jack Donald, Jaka Dewa, and Erwin Sumampow, managed to bring Persipal to the 1979 PSSI Liga Perserikatan Big 12 Final against Persipura Jayapura.

At that time, in the 1970s, Persipal Palu was coached by Ramang, a world football legend from Makassar, South Sulawesi, they have even played matches with European clubs such as AFC Ajax and Feyenoord from the Netherlands, Votslin from Austria and Asian club Ansan Hallelujah from South Korea.

But over time, their achievements have decreased, since 1995 they are still difficult to get out of the Liga Indonesia First Division zone of the Liga Indonesia. In the 2010-2011 season, Persipal Palu could have almost made it to the Divisi Utama if they had not lost to Persbul Buol in the Knock Out match towards the last 8 of Divisi Utama at the Gawalise Stadium, Palu.

Prior to 2022–23 Liga 3 where Persipal initially competed, they bought Liga 2 club's license, Muba Babel United and officially merged. Persipal competed in 2022–23 Liga 2 after the merger.

For the upcoming 2022-23 season, Persipal will field two teams in two different leagues. The senior team, named Persipal Palu BU (Babel United) will compete in the 2022–23 Liga 2, while the youth team, simply called Persipal Palu, will compete in the 2022–23 Liga 3. This setup is similar to that of Persib Bandung and Bandung United as well as Persebaya Surabaya and PS Kota Pahlawan.

Players

Current squad

Coaching Staff

Honours
Liga Indonesia Second Division 
 Champions: 1996–97
'''Liga 3 Central Sulawesi
 Champions: 2017, 2021

References

External links
Persipal Palu at Liga-Indonesia.co.id
 

Football clubs in Indonesia
Football clubs in Central Sulawesi
1977 establishments in Indonesia
Association football clubs established in 1977
Palu